Eilatimonas is a Gram-negative, rod-shaped and motile genus of bacteria from the family Temperatibacteraceae, with one known species (Eilatimonas milleporae). Eilatimonas milleporae has been isolated from the hydrocoral Millepora dichotoma from the Gulf of Eilat in Israel.

References

Alphaproteobacteria
Bacteria genera
Monotypic bacteria genera
Taxa described in 2013